Alamo Lake is a census-designated place in La Paz County, Arizona, United States. Its population was 4 as of the 2020 census. The community includes Alamo Lake State Park.

Demographics

Alamo Lake first appeared on the 2010 U.S. Census as a census-designated place (CDP). With 25 residents, it is the second-smallest community in La Paz County after Sunwest.

References

Census-designated places in La Paz County, Arizona